Dženis Kozica (born 28 April 1993) is a Swedish footballer who plays for Öster.

Club career
On 10 May 2018 he played as Djurgården beat Malmö FF 3–0 in the Swedish Cup Final.

On 20 January 2022, Kozica signed with Öster.

Honours

Club
Djurgårdens IF
Allsvenskan: 2019
 Svenska Cupen: 2017–18

References

External links 
 

1993 births
Living people
Swedish footballers
Sweden youth international footballers
Swedish people of Bosnia and Herzegovina descent
Association football midfielders
IFK Värnamo players
Jönköpings Södra IF players
Djurgårdens IF Fotboll players
AFC Eskilstuna players
Trelleborgs FF players
Östers IF players
Ettan Fotboll players
Superettan players
Allsvenskan players